Richard Allsebrook (born 25 September 1892 in Newstead, Nottinghamshire, England) was a footballer who played in The Football League for Notts County. He also played for Welsh club Ebbw Vale.

References

English footballers
Notts County F.C. players
English Football League players
1892 births
1961 deaths
Association football defenders
Ebbw Vale F.C. players